Heavy Fire is the third studio album by hard rock band Black Star Riders, released on February 3, 2017. Black Star Riders evolved from the touring version of Thin Lizzy, assembled by guitarist Scott Gorham after the death of Thin Lizzy's leader Phil Lynott. The band's first two albums, All Hell Breaks Loose and The Killer Instinct, were released in 2013 and 2015 respectively.

It was the last Black Star Riders album to feature guitarist/songwriter Damon Johnson and drummer Jimmy DeGrasso, both of whom had been with the band since its inception. The standard edition of the album concluded with the first Black Star Riders song not to feature Johnson as a co-writer.

Recording
Continuing to work with producer Nick Raskulinecz after the success of The Killer Instinct, Heavy Fire was recorded at Raskulinecz' studio outside Nashville, Tennessee in the autumn of 2016. Gorham said, "Not many new bands get to record three albums these days. Without doubt this is BSR's best album so far. We had a great time recording it and can't wait to play the new songs live on tour in March."

The album was marketed via PledgeMusic, and its release was followed in March 2017 by a full UK tour supported by Gun, The Amorettes and Backyard Babies sharing the opening support slots.

The first single from the album, "When the Night Comes In", was premiered on Planet Rock radio on November 15, 2016. The follow-up single, "Testify or Say Goodbye", was first played on BBC Radio 2 by Ken Bruce on January 5, 2017.

Content
"Dancing With the Wrong Girl" and "Cold War Love" are the first Black Star Riders songs to feature bassist Robbie Crane credited as a composer. Heavy Fire is Crane's second album with the group.

"Letting Go of Me" is the first Black Star Riders song not to be co-written by Damon Johnson.

Damon Johnson contributes mellotron on unspecified tracks while producer Nick Raskulinecz plays on "Letting Go of Me". "Testify or Say Goodbye" features organ from session musician Fred Mandel.

Track listing

Personnel
Ricky Warwick – lead vocals, rhythm guitar
Scott Gorham – lead and rhythm guitar
Damon Johnson – lead and rhythm guitar, lap steel, mellotron, backing vocals
Robbie Crane – bass guitar
Jimmy DeGrasso – drums
Wendy Moten, Gale Mayes, Drea Rhenee – backing vocals on tracks 2 and 9
Pearl Aday – backing vocals on track 6
Fred Mandel – Hammond B3 organ on track 6
Nick Raskulinecz – mellotron on track 10

Charts

References

2017 albums
Black Star Riders albums
Nuclear Blast albums
Albums produced by Nick Raskulinecz